Natalie Orellana Bendaña (born 4 February 2001) is an American-born Nicaraguan footballer who plays as a midfielder for Canadian college team Keyano Huskies and the Nicaragua women's national team.

Early life
Orellana was raised in Pinole, California.

International career
Orellana capped for Nicaragua at senior level during the 2018 Central American and Caribbean Games.

References 

2001 births
Living people
People with acquired Nicaraguan citizenship
Nicaraguan women's footballers
Women's association football midfielders
Nicaragua women's international footballers
Nicaraguan women's footballers
Nicaraguan expatriate sportspeople in Canada
Expatriate women's soccer players in Canada
People from Pinole, California
Sportspeople from the San Francisco Bay Area
Soccer players from California
American women's soccer players
American people of Nicaraguan descent
American women's soccer players
American expatriate sportspeople in Canada